The 22nd Canadian Film Awards were held on October 3, 1970 to honour achievements in Canadian film. The ceremony was hosted by Bill Walker.

The awards faced some controversy when Cinepix Film Properties withdrew the films Love in a Four Letter World and Here and Now (L'Initiation) from the competition after an article in Time implied that the Canadian Film Award jury was unsympathetic to the films' sexual content. Jean Pierre Lefebvre also threatened to withdraw the film Q-Bec My Love from the competition if the Ontario Censor Board did not withdraw its demand for the film's explicit sexuality to be edited, although provincial cabinet minister James Auld intervened to dissuade the board from insisting on the cuts.

Winners

Films
Film of the Year: Psychocratie (To See or Not to See) - National Film Board of Canada, Robert Verrall and Wolf Koenig producers, Břetislav Pojar director
Feature Film: Goin' Down the Road - Evdon Films, Donald Shebib producer and director
Film Under 30 Minutes: Blake - National Film Board of Canada, Douglas Jackson producer, Bill Mason director
Film Over 30 Minutes: A Matter of Fat - National Film Board of Canada, Desmond Dew, producer, William Weintraub director
Documentary Under 30 Minutes: KW+ - Onyx Films, Hydro-Québec, Aimée Danis director
Documentary Over 30 Minutes: Wild Africa - Canadian Broadcasting Corporation, William Bantings and John Livingston producers and directors
Animated: Psychocratie (To See or Not to See) - National Film Board of Canada, Robert Verrall and Wolf Koenig producers, Břetislav Pojar director
Arts and Experimental: Legend - National Film Board of Canada, Tom Daly producer, Rick Raxlen director
TV Drama: Not awarded
TV Information: A Little Fellow from Gambo - The Joey Smallwood Story - National Film Board of Canada, Julian Biggs producer and director
Travel and Recreation: The Sun Don't Shine on the Same Dawg's Back All the Time - Crawley Films, F. R. Crawley producer
Public Relations: A Hospital Is... - Crawley Films, F. R. Crawley and James Turpie producer, James Turpie director
Sales Promotion: Home Sweet Cedar - Canawest Film Productions

Feature Film Craft Awards
Performance by a Lead Actor: Paul Bradley and Doug McGrath - Goin' Down the Road (Evdon Films)
Performance by a Lead Actress: Geneviève Bujold - The Act of the Heart (Quest Film Productions)
Supporting Actor: Gratien Gélinas -  Red (Onyx Films)
Supporting Actress: Fernande Giroux - Red (Onyx Films)
Art Direction: Anne Pritchard - The Act of the Heart (Quest Film Productions)
Cinematography: Bernard Chentrier - Red (Quest Film Productions)
Direction: Paul Almond - The Act of the Heart (Quest Film Productions)
Film Editing: Christopher Cordeaux - Prologue (NFB)
Sound Editing: Jean-Pierre Joutel and John Knight - The Act of the Heart (Quest Film Productions)
Music Score: Harry Freedman - The Act of the Heart (Quest Film Productions)
Original Screenplay: William Fruet - Goin' Down the Road (Evdon Films)
Overall Sound: David Howells, Ron Alexander and Roger Lamoureux - The Act of the Heart (Quest Film Productions)

Non-Feature Craft Awards
Performance by a Lead Actor: Joey Smallwood - A Little Fellow from Gambo - The Joey Smallwood Story (NFB)
Performance by a Lead Actress: Linda Goranson - The Manipulators: The Spike in the Wall (CBC)
Black-and-White Cinematography: Paul Leach - Mrs. Case (NFB)
Colour Cinematography: Bob Ennis - Multiplicity
Direction: Julian Biggs - A Little Fellow from Gambo - The Joey Smallwood Story (NFB)
Editing: Yves Langlois - 70-71
Sound Editing: Lucien Marleau - Fields of Space (NFB)
Musical Score: Eldon Rathburn - Fields of Space (NFB)
Screenplay: Ian McNeill - Freud: The Hidden Nature of Man (International Cinemedia Center)
Non-Dramatic Script: Bill Davies - The Oshawa Kid (NFB)
Sound Recording: Jacques Duran - Activator One (NFB)
Sound Re-Recording: Ron Alexander and Michel Descombes - Activator One (NFB)

Special AwardsMichael Rubbo - "for reportage in Sad Song of Yellow Skin" (NFB)Challenge for Change Unit - "for reportage in You Are on Indian Land" (NFB)Peter Rowe - most promising newcomer for The Neon Palace (Acme Idea & Sale Production)CPFL Broadcasting - "for courageous screen journalism in The Erie Report"
Wendy Michener Award: Jean Pierre Lefebvre "for outstanding artistic achievement"
John Drainie Award: Harry J. Boyle''' "for distinguished service to broadcasting"

References

Canadian
Canadian Film Awards (1949–1978)
1970 in Canada